Psyllipsocidae is a family of cave barklice in the order Psocodea. There are about 7 genera and more than 70 described species in Psyllipsocidae.

Genera
These eight genera belong to the family Psyllipsocidae:
 Annulipsyllipsocus Hakim, Azar, Maksoud, Huang & Azar, 2018 Burmese amber, Cenomanian
 Libanopsyllipsocus Azar and Nel, 2011 Lebanese amber, Barremian
† Concavapsocus Wang et al, 2019 Burmese amber, Cenomanian
 Dorypteryx Aaron, 1883
† Khatangia Vishnyakova, 1975 Taimyr amber, Santonian
 Pseudopsyllipsocus Li, 2002
 Pseudorypteryx Garcia Aldrete, 1984
 Psocathropos Ribaga, 1899
 Psyllipsocus Selys-Longchamps, 1872

References

Further reading

External links

 

Trogiomorpha